USS Bulloch County (LST-509) was an  built for the United States Navy during World War II. Named for Bulloch County, Georgia, she was the only U.S. Naval vessel to bear the name.

LST-509 was laid down on 7 October 1943 at Jeffersonville, Indiana by the Jeffersonville Boat & Machine Company; launched on 23 November 1943; sponsored by Lieutenant (j.g.) Dorothy L. Nims, USCG(W); and commissioned on 20 January 1944.

During World War II, LST-509 was assigned to the European Theater and participated in the Invasion of Normandy in June, 1944. Following the war, LST-509 returned to the United States and was redesignated USS Bulloch County (LST-509) on 1 July 1955.

She was recommissioned in 1966 and served in the Vietnam War until she was transferred to the Republic of Vietnam Navy in April 1970.

She was used primarily for provisioning forward coastal and river US Marine bases such as Tân Mỹ Base (now Thuan An) and Cửa Việt Base located in I Corps and bases further south such as Vũng Tàu, Cam Ranh Bay and Nha Trang.

Other duties included coastal picket and resupply duty during Operation Market Time in which she resupplied and provided off-patrol berthing for Patrol Craft Fast crews interdicting Viet Cong communication and supply routes.

The starboard screw and rudder were once damaged by a floating mine in the Cua Viet River. She continued operations on one screw until another could be fitted at Da Nang. She suffered serious enough storm damage during a typhoon during a voyage to Okinawa in 1969, to require emergency repairs while beached and more complete repairs in a graving dock at Sasebo, Japan.

On 8 April 1970, the ship was decommissioned and leased to the Republic of Vietnam under the Security Assistance Program for service as Qui Nhon (HQ-504). After 1975, she served in the Vietnam People's Navy with new registration as HQ-505.

In 1988 she was heavily damaged in the Johnson South Reef Skirmish by the Chinese frigate Yingtan. The Vietnam People's Navy, in an effort to save her, tried to bring her to Cam Ranh Bay for repair but she sank south of Great Discovery Reef in the Spratly Islands area. The ship and her crew were granted the title of Hero of the People's Armed Forces.

LST-509 earned one battle star for World War II service.

See also
 List of United States Navy LSTs
 Republic of Vietnam Navy

References

 
 

LST-491-class tank landing ships
World War II amphibious warfare vessels of the United States
Cold War amphibious warfare vessels of the United States
Ships of the Vietnam People's Navy
Bulloch County, Georgia
Ships built in Jeffersonville, Indiana
1943 ships